Inner Worlds is an album by the Mahavishnu Orchestra. It was the group's sixth album release, as well as their last for nearly ten years. 

In 1975, violinist Jean-Luc Ponty and keyboardist Gayle Moran left the band. Stu Goldberg was brought in as a replacement for Moran. Although they were not officially recorded, initially this version of the group still retained Norma Jean Bell, Carol Shive, Phillip Hirschi, Russell Tubbs and Steve Kindler. After some hasty rehearsals, this line-up toured with Jeff Beck.  After the tour, McLaughlin pared the band down to a quartet of himself, Goldberg, Walden and Armstrong, and then the album was recorded.

This would be the last album by the Mahavishnu Orchestra for nearly ten years, when leader and guitarist John McLaughlin re-formed the group in 1984.

Track listing and personnel

Side One
 "All in the Family" - (John McLaughlin) - 6:02
 John McLaughlin - guitar, guitar synthesizer
 Stu Goldberg - organ, piano
 Ralphe Armstrong - bass
 Narada Michael Walden - drums, congas, bass marimba, shaker
 "Miles Out" - (John McLaughlin) - 6:44
 John McLaughlin - guitar, "360" systems frequency shifter
 Stu Goldberg - customized Mini-Moog and Steiner-Parker synthesizers 
 Ralphe Armstrong - bass
 Narada Michael Walden - drums
 "In My Life" - (John McLaughlin, Narada Michael Walden) - 3:22
 John McLaughlin - 12-string acoustic guitar, backing vocals
 Stu Goldberg - backing vocals
 Ralphe Armstrong - bass
 Narada Michael Walden - lead vocals, piano, drums
 "Gita" - (John McLaughlin) -4:29
 John McLaughlin - guitar synthesizer, backing vocals
 Stu Goldberg - organ, piano
 Ralphe Armstrong - bass
 Narada Michael Walden - drums, lead vocals
 "Morning Calls" - (John McLaughlin, Narada Michael Walden) - 1:23 
 John McLaughlin - guitar synthesizer
 Narada Michael Walden - organ

Side Two
 "The Way of the Pilgrim" - (Narada Michael Walden) - 5:15
 John McLaughlin - guitar, guitar synthesizer
 Stu Goldberg - customized Mini-Moog and Steiner-Parker synthesizers, piano
 Ralphe Armstrong - bass
 Narada Michael Walden - drums, tympani
 "River of My Heart" - (Kanchan Cynthia Anderson, Narada Michael Walden) - 3:41
 Ralphe Armstrong - double bass
 Narada Michael Walden - piano, lead vocals, percussion
 "Planetary Citizen" - (Ralphe Armstrong) - 2:14
 John McLaughlin - guitar, backing vocals
 Stu Goldberg - clavinet, backing vocals
 Ralphe Armstrong - bass, lead vocals
 Narada Michael Walden - drums, backing vocals
 "Lotus Feet" - (John McLaughlin) - 4:24
 John McLaughlin - guitar synthesizer
 Stu Goldberg - customized Mini-Moog and Steiner-Parker synthesizers
 Narada Michael Walden - congas, sleigh bells
 "Inner Worlds" - 6:37
 Part 1 - (John McLaughlin)
 Part 2 - (Stu Goldberg)
 John McLaughlin - guitar, guitar synthesizer, frequency shifter, E-mu synthesizer/sequencer
 Stu Goldberg - customized Mini-Moog, Steiner-Parker and string synthesizers
 Ralphe Armstrong - brassmaster bass
 Narada Michael Walden - drums, gong, tympani

Charts
 Album

Billboard (United States)

References

Mahavishnu Orchestra albums
1976 albums